Franz Hessel (November 21, 1880 – January 6, 1941) was a German writer and translator. With Walter Benjamin, he produced a German translation of three volumes of Marcel Proust's 1913-1927 work À la recherche du temps perdu in the late 1920s.

Hessel's parents, Fanny and Heinrich Hessel, came to Berlin in 1880, and joined the Lutheran church (having been born Jewish). In 1900, when Franz Hessel's father dies, he left a large fortune, enabling Franz Hessel to live a carefree life in Munich and Paris. In 1901, he attends the Ludwig Maximilian University of Munich, where he publishes twelve poems in Avalun. Ein Jahrbuch neuer deutscher lyrischer Wortkunst. In 1908, he publishes his first prose prose collection, Laura Wunderl. Müncher Novellen. In 1913, he marries Helen Grund, and publishes Der Kramladen des Glücks. On 27 July 1914, their first son Ulrich is born, and in 1917, their second son Stefan is born.  In 1920, he publishes Pariser Romanze. In 1922, he publishes Von den Irrtümern der Liebenden. Eine Nachtwache.

Hessel became one of the first German exponents of the French idea of flânerie, and in 1929 published a collection of essays on the subject related to his native Berlin, Walking in Berlin. Reviewing the book in 1929, Benjamin described it as "an echo of the stories the city has told [Hessel] ever since he was a child—an epic book through and through, a process of memorizing while strolling around, a book for which memory has acted not as the source but as the Muse." Concluding, Benjamin wrote: "if a Berliner is willing to explore his city for any treasures other than neon advertisements, he will grow to love this book."

In October 1938, the Hessels flee Germany for exile in Paris. In April 1940, the family flees Paris for Sanary-sur-Mer. In May, Franz and Ulrich are interned in Camp des Milles. On 27 July 1940, both are released and are able to return to Helen in Sanary-sur-Mer. However, Franz has dysentery, and has suffered a stroke, from which he does not recover. 

Hessel inspired the character of Jules in Henri-Pierre Roche's novel Jules et Jim.

English Translations 
 Walking in Berlin. Translated by Amanda DeMarco. Scribe Publications, 2017.

References

External links
 
 
 

1880 births
1941 deaths
19th-century German Jews
Converts to Lutheranism from Judaism
20th-century German translators
German male non-fiction writers
Writers from Berlin